Cliff Graydon is a farmer and former politician in Manitoba, Canada. He was a member of the Legislative Assembly of Manitoba from 2007 to 2019, representing the electoral division of Emerson.

Graydon was born in Arnaud, Manitoba and has farmed for 30 years, growing grain and raising cattle. Before entering politics, Graydon was a founding member of the Manitoba Cattle Producers Association and served on its board of directors. He has also served as a member of the Stuartburn Piney Agricultural Development Association and the Prairies East Sustainable Agricultural Initiative.

Political career

After being elected in 2007, Graydon held various critic portfolios during his time in caucus, including: MPI; Liquor Control; Lotteries; Gaming; Agriculture; Entrepreneurship, Training and Trade; and Healthy Living and Seniors. Graydon was Progressive Conservative caucus whip from 2016 to 2017.

Graydon underwent sensitivity training in early 2018 after posting on Twitter that asylum seekers in Canada are a "drain on society." He had previously retweeted a post about Prime Minister of Canada Justin Trudeau which asked "How can any woman vote for that SICK/RETARDED/TRAITOR?"

On October 22, 2018, Graydon was expelled from caucus following allegations of sexual harassment by two legislative staffers. Before his expulsion, Graydon had indicated he would take a medical leave of absence from the legislature, not seek reelection in the next provincial election, and undergo further sensitivity training.

Graydon held a news conference on November 8, 2018 in which he denied all allegations, stating: "I admit I’m guilty of having a bad sense of humour and sincerely apologize to those who have been offended by my inconsiderate jokes. I have grown up in a different era and realize some people today are much more sensitive to inappropriate humour." Graydon was subsequently accused of having groped and propositioned a party staffer for sex in September, 2017.

In July 2019 Graydon declared he would contest the upcoming provincial election as an Independent in the new constituency of Borderland. The riding was created by the 2018 provincial redistribution out of parts of Emerson and Morden-Winkler. He finished in third place behind PC candidate Josh Guenter.

Electoral results

References 

Progressive Conservative Party of Manitoba MLAs
Living people
People from Eastman Region, Manitoba
Farmers from Manitoba
21st-century Canadian politicians
Year of birth missing (living people)